Aristomenes of Alyzeia or Aristomenes the Acarnanian (born 3rd century BC; died 2nd century BC) was regent and chief minister of Egypt in the Ptolemaic period during the reign of the boy king Ptolemy V.

Aristomenes, son of Menneas, was a native of the city of Alyzeia in Acarnania, Greece. He migrated to Egypt some time after 216 BC and became regent Priest of Alexander in 204/3 BC. He supplanted Tlepolemus as regent in 201 BC. In 197/196 BC, when Ptolemy V at the age of 12 took personal control of the kingdom, Aristomenes remained chief minister; this was his role when the "Memphis Decree" (recorded on the Rosetta Stone) was issued in March 196. He fell from power, for unknown reasons, in 192 BC.

Sources

Primary sources
Polybius, xv.25, 31

Secondary works
Edwyn Bevan, The House of Ptolemy, Chapter 7, passim
 Walter Ameling, "Aristomenes [2]" in Der neue Pauly vol. 1 pp. 1115–1116

3rd-century BC births
2nd-century BC deaths
Ptolemaic regents
3rd-century BC Greek people
2nd-century BC Greek people
Ancient Acarnanians
Priests of the Ptolemaic cult of Alexander the Great